The parakeet auklet (Aethia psittacula) is a small seabird of the North Pacific. Parakeet Auklets used to be placed on its own in the genus Cyclorrhynchus (Kaup, 1829) but recent morphological and genetic evidence suggest it should be placed in the genus Aethia, making them closely related to crested auklets and least auklets. It is associated with the boreal waters of Alaska, Kamchatka and Siberia. It breeds on the cliffs, slopes and boulder fields of offshore islands, generally moving south during the winter.

Description
The parakeet auklet is a small (23 cm) auk with a short orange bill that is upturned to give the bird its curious fixed expression. The upward bend of the beak has been observed to provide advantages in picking up small food pieces from the sea bottom as well as in assisting in the disintegration of larger food objects. The bird's plumage is dark above and white below. with a single white plume projecting back from the eye. There is a small amount of variation between breeding and winter plumage.

The parakeet auklet is a highly vocal species at the nest, calling once it arrives at the nest and then duetting once its mate arrives. It makes a series of rhythmic hoarse calls (like that of the Cassin's auklet) and a quavering squeal. The function of these are unknown, but could be associated with defending its burrow from intruders and strengthening the bond with its mate.

Taxonomy 
The Parakeet Auklet was formerly included in the genus Cyclorrhynchus, avians with a  nearly circular profile of the bill. But following recent phylogenetic study, this species could be closer to the Crested Auklet, Least Auklet and Whiskered Auklet.

Behaviour and breeding

The parakeet auklet's food varies with season, during the breeding season it takes mostly small planktonic crustaceans such as euphausiids, copepods and amphipods. Recent research shows it also preys on jellyfish in some areas. It often feeds at a considerable distance from the colony, diving up to 30 m to reach its prey.

Breeding begins in April and May in colonies that are often shared with other auk species. The pair lay one egg, which is incubated for just over a month, the chick is then fed 4 times a day for around 35 days. The chick fledges at night, flying out to sea alone.

Relationship with humans 
The parakeet auklet has little contact with humans despite its large population, this is largely due to their remote breeding and wintering. However, the parakeet auklet still faces issues caused by marine pollution and ingestion of small plastics.

Status and conservation 

The parakeet auklet is not considered threatened, there are estimated to be over a million individuals in the North Pacific. It is not thought to have declined recently, but may be threatened in the future by introduced predators and oil spills.

References

 Collinson, Martin. 2006. [http://www.britishbirds.co.uk/search?id=9283 Splitting headaches? Recent taxonomic changes affecting the British and Western Palaearctic lists] British Birds 99: 306-323.
 del Hoyo, J., Elliott, A. and Ssargatal, J. (eds.) 1996 Handbook of the Birds of the World, Vol. 3: Hoatzin to Auks. Lynx Edicions: Barcelona, Spain. 
 Harrison, P.. 1983. Seabirds, an Identification Guide.  Houghton Mufflin Co.: Boston, USA. 448pp. 
 "National Geographic"  Field Guide to the Birds of North America 
 Sibley, D.A. 2001. The Sibley Guide to Birds. Alfred Knopf: New York, USA.

External links

 Parakeet auklet images http://tsuru-bird.net/image.htm Copyright 2009 - Monte M. Taylor

parakeet auklet
parakeet auklet
Birds of the Aleutian Islands
parakeet auklet
Taxa named by Peter Simon Pallas